"Best Friend" is a song by American duo Sofi Tukker featuring Australian duo Nervo, American duo The Knocks and Japanese singer Alisa Ueno. It was released on September 12, 2017, as the third single from their debut album Treehouse.
It was also featured in a commercial for the iPhone X.

Composition
The song is written in the key of B minor.

Music video
The music video was uploaded on October 25, 2017, by Ultra Music.

Chart performance
The track reached number one on Billboards Dance/Mix Show Airplay chart in its January 20, 2018 issue, giving the four acts their first chart topper, and their best showing anywhere on the Billboard charts.

Usage in media
The song was featured in a commercial for Apple's iPhone X. The song is a part of FIFA 18 soundtrack. It was also used in the advertisement of Friends Ultra Marathons on Comedy Central India. In 2017, the song was featured during a prominent scene in TNT's "Good Behavior" episode titled "It's No Fun If It's Easy". In 2018, the song was featured in the end credits of Netflix's Santa Clarita Diet episode titled "Suspicious Objects", and in the film Oceans 8. The song is also the opening and closing theme, and bumper music to the MLB Network show MLB Central.

Track listing

Charts

Weekly charts

Year-end charts

Certifications

Release history

References

2017 singles
2017 songs
Sofi Tukker songs
Alisa Ueno songs
Nervo (DJs) songs
Macaronic songs
Song recordings produced by Sofi Tukker
Songs written by Miriam Nervo
Songs written by Olivia Nervo
The Knocks songs
Ultra Music singles